The 1985–86 Montana State Bobcats men's basketball team represented Montana State University as a member of the Big Sky Conference during the 1985–86 NCAA Division I men's basketball season. Lead by head coach Stu Starner, the Bobcats finished in 6th place after the Big Sky regular season. The team rallied and made a run to win the Big Sky tournament and earn an automatic bid to the NCAA tournament. Playing as No. 16 seed in the West region, Montana State pushed No. 1 seed St. John's before falling, 83–74, in the opening round.

Roster

Schedule and results

|-
!colspan=9 style=| Regular season

|-
!colspan=9 style=| Big Sky tournament

|-
!colspan=9 style=| NCAA Tournament

References 

Montana State Bobcats men's basketball seasons
Montana State
Montana State Bobcats basketball
Montana State Bobcats basketball
Montana State